Cross Fire is an album by James Blood Ulmer's Music Revelation Ensemble, with guest saxophonists Pharoah Sanders and John Zorn, recorded in 1996 and released on the Japanese DIW label.

Reception
The Allmusic review by Don Snowden awarded the album 4 stars, stating, "Music Revelation Ensemble seems to be the context that Blood Ulmer reserves his strongest melodies for, and he plays with the kind of fire and invention that made him a major figure. Cross Fire probably isn't the best place to plunge in and explore the music, but it's a very worthy addition to the catalog".

Track listing
All compositions by James Blood Ulmer
 "Law" – 5:36   
 "Suspect" – 7:10   
 "Devotion" – 4:30   
 "Sweet" – 5:18   
 "Proof" – 6:36   
 "My Prayer" – 9:14   
 "Evidence" – 7:59   
 "Backbeat" – 6:40

Personnel
James Blood Ulmer – guitar
Calvin "Hassan Truth" Jones – acoustic bass
Cornell Rochester – drums
John Zorn – alto saxophone (tracks 1, 3, 5 & 8)
Pharoah Sanders – tenor saxophone (tracks 2, 4, 6 & 7)

References 

1997 albums
James Blood Ulmer albums
DIW Records albums